AUT may refer to the following.

Locations
Austria (ISO 3166-1 country code)
Agongointo-Zoungoudo Underground Town, Benin
Aktio–Preveza Undersea Tunnel, Greece
Airstrip on Atauro Island, East Timor (IATA airport code)

Organizations
Arriva UK Trains
Association of University Teachers, a former British trade union
Aut Even Hospital, Ireland

Education 
Amirkabir University of Technology, Iran
Auckland University of Technology, New Zealand
Aristotle University of Thessaloniki, Greece
American University of Technology, Lebanon
Association of University Teachers a former trade union in the United Kingdom

Computing 
Advanced and application unit testing, test techniques in computer programming
Application under test, in software testing, the software that is to be tested (by other software)
Atlantis Underwater Tycoon, a computer game
Autonomous Things, technologies that bring autonomous computers into the physical environment

Other fields 
An automorphism group in mathematics
Automated ultrasonic testing, for pipeline construction girthwelds
Aeronautica Umbra Trojani AUT.18, an Italian fighter aircraft prototype of 1939
Reporting mark for Autauga Northern Railroad
Reporting mark for Auto-Train Corporation